Equipoise is the sixth studio album by alternative rock singer-songwriter Happy Rhodes. It was released in 1993 on Aural Gratification.

Track listing
"Runners" – 6:00
"He Will Come" – 4:08
"The Flight" – 4:52
"Out Like A Lamb" – 6:48
"Save Our Souls" – 6:16
"Closer" – 5:05
Additional vocals by Kelly Bird
"Temporary And Eternal" – 4:51
"Cohabitants" – 5:41
"Play The Game" – 6:28
"Mother Sea" – 5:24
"I Say" – 5:39

Personnel
Happy Rhodes – vocals, guitar, percussion, keyboards
Kevin Bartlett – guitar, percussion, bass percussion, keyboards
Chuck D'Aloia  – guitars
Ray Jung – fretless bass
Mark Foster – snare drum
Andy Wyman – bagpipes
Martha Waterman – piano
Kelly Bird – vocals

1993 albums
Happy Rhodes albums